Penicillium parvulum is a monoverticillate species of fungus in the genus Penicillium which was isolated from soil of a peanut field in Georgia.

References

parvulum
Fungi described in 2009